Hewitt-Lindstrom was a United States automobile manufacturer which produced electric stanhope style automobiles from 1900 to 1901.  The company was based in Chicago, Illinois.

See also
 Brass Era car
 List of defunct United States automobile manufacturers

References
David Burgess Wise, The New Illustrated Encyclopedia of Automobiles

1900s cars
Motor vehicle manufacturers based in Illinois
Defunct motor vehicle manufacturers of the United States
History of Chicago
Electric vehicles introduced in the 20th century
Vintage vehicles
Electric vehicle industry